is a passenger railway station in the city of Tomioka, Gunma, Japan, operated by the private railway operator Jōshin Dentetsu.

Lines

Station layout
The station consists of one side platform serving traffic in both directions.

Adjacent stations

History
Operations were suspended from 1 September 1951 to 15 January 1953, when the station reopened under its present name. The current station building was completed in 1968.

Surrounding area

Tomioka Nanokaichi Post Office
Nanokaichi Hospital

See also
 List of railway stations in Japan

External links

 Jōshin Dentetsu 
  Burari-Gunma 

Railway stations in Gunma Prefecture
Railway stations in Japan opened in 1937
Tomioka, Gunma